Rosir Calderón Díaz (born 28 December 1984) is a Cuban-born Russian volleyball player, who was a member of the Cuban women's national team that won the bronze medal at the 2004 Summer Olympics. In November 2014, she received Russian Sport citizenship. She plays for the Greek club AEK Athens of the A1 Ethniki women's volleyball league.

Personal life
Calderón was born in Havana, Cuba, on December 28, 1984 and is the daughter of former national coach Luis Felipe Calderón and former Morenas del Caribe World Champion Erenia Díaz. She moved to Russia, getting married there. In November 2014, she received her Russian sport nationality from the FIVB, in addition to her already own civil Russian passport. She later expressed her concern about joining the Russian National team because of the hard competition to earn a spot and because she wanted to dedicate time to her family.

Career
Calderon played the 2005 FIVB World Grand Prix helping her team to reach the 4th place and earning the  Best Spiker award. She later played the 2006 FIVB qualification championship won by her national team and she was awarded Most Valuable Player and Best Spiker.

In November 2006, Calderon played the 2006 FIVB World Championship, helping Cuba to the 7th place. She posted a 59.68 average of success during the tournament to win the Best Spiker award and the US$50,000 reward.

Calderón was one of six players included by the Cuban National Federation in an agreement with their Russian counterpart led by the head coach Nikolai Karpol, who previously visited the Island, in order to raise the Cuban technical level. She played with the Russian Club Uraločka NTMK for the 2005/2006 season and finished that season as league's Best Scorer.

She decided to take a break from volleyball in 2009 and gave birth in February 2010, returning to the court in August 2010.

Calderon was signed by the Swiss club Voléro Zürich in a 5 years contract in February 2011 and transferred on loan to Galatasaray in August 2011.

Galatasaray played the 2011/2012 in the CEV Cup, making it to the finals where they faced the Italian club Yamamay Busto Arsizio, winning the first final series match 3-1, but they lost 1-3 and lost the Golden Set to end in second place.

Calderon played the 2012–13 CEV Women's Champions League with Galatasaray Daikin, finishing in fourth place after falling to Vakıfbank in the semifinals and Unendo Busto in the third place match. Eventough, she won the tournament's Best Spiker award.

After being transfer on loan to the Russian Club Dinamo Krasnodar with a 3-year contract, Calderón won the gold medal and the Most Valuable Player at the Basel's Top Volley International tournament.

In December 2014, Calderon won with her club the Russian Cup, after defeating Omichka Omsk.
Taking the Golden Set, Calderón's Dinamo Krasnodar won the 2014–15 CEV Cup defeating the Polish club PGE Atom Trefl Sopot in Poland. Shortly afterwards, the Krasnodar club received a wild card to compete at the 2015 FIVB Club World Championship. After winning Rexona Ades Rio in the semifinals, they lost to Eczacıbaşı VitrA in the final match.

In August 2022, Calderon joined the Greek club AEK Athens.

Clubs
  Ciudad Habana (2003–2005)
  Uraločka NTMK (2005–2006)
  Ciudad Habana (2006–2009)
  Voléro Zürich (2010–2011)
  Galatasaray Daikin (2011–2013)
  Dinamo Krasnodar (2013–2015)
  Eczacıbaşı VitrA (2015–2016)
  Ageo Medics (2016–2017)
  RC Cannes (2016–2017)
  Volero Zurich (2017–2018)
  Volero Le Cannet (2018–2019)
  Bandung Bank BJB Pakuan (2019–2020)
  Bolu Belediyespor (2021–2022)
  AEK Athens (2022–present)

Awards

Individuals
 2005 FIVB World Grand Prix "Best Spiker"
 2005-06 Russian League "Best Scorer"
 2006 World Championship "Best Spiker"
 2007 Montreux Volley Masters "Best Spiker"
 2008 Summer Olympics "Best Spiker"
 2012-13 CEV Champions League "Best Spiker"

Club
 2011-12 Turkish Cup -  Runner-up, with Galatasaray Daikin
 2011-12 CEV Cup -  Runner-up, with Galatasaray Daikin
 2012 Turkish Volleyball Super Cup -  Runner-Up, with Galatasaray Daikin
 2012-13 Turkish Cup -  Bronze Medal with Galatasaray Daikin
 2013-14 Russian Cup -  Bronze Medal with Dinamo Krasnodar
 2014-15 Russian Cup -  Champion, with Dinamo Krasnodar
 2014–15 CEV Cup -  Champion, with Dinamo Krasnodar
 2015 FIVB Club World Championship -  Runner-up, with Dinamo Krasnodar

References

External links
FIVB Profile

1984 births
Living people
Cuban women's volleyball players
Cuban expatriate sportspeople in Turkey
Cuban expatriate sportspeople in Switzerland
Olympic bronze medalists for Cuba
Volleyball players at the 2004 Summer Olympics
Volleyball players at the 2008 Summer Olympics
Volleyball players at the 2007 Pan American Games
Olympic medalists in volleyball
Galatasaray S.K. (women's volleyball) players
Medalists at the 2004 Summer Olympics
Pan American Games medalists in volleyball
Pan American Games gold medalists for Cuba
Central American and Caribbean Games silver medalists for Cuba
Competitors at the 2006 Central American and Caribbean Games
Opposite hitters
Outside hitters
Cuban emigrants to Russia
Expatriate volleyball players in Turkey
Expatriate volleyball players in Switzerland
Expatriate volleyball players in Russia
Eczacıbaşı volleyball players
Central American and Caribbean Games medalists in volleyball
Medalists at the 2007 Pan American Games
Cuban expatriate sportspeople in France
Cuban expatriate sportspeople in Japan
Cuban expatriate sportspeople in Indonesia
Expatriate volleyball players in France
Expatriate volleyball players in Greece
Expatriate volleyball players in Japan
Expatriate volleyball players in Indonesia
Cuban expatriate sportspeople in Greece